Elena Rivera Villajos (born 29 August 1992) is a Spanish actress. She became popular for her long-lasting role as Karina in Cuéntame cómo pasó.

Biography 
Elena Rivera Villajos was born in Zaragoza on 29 August 1992. She took part in the singing talent television show Menudas Estrellas when she was 6 years old, impersonating Paloma San Basilio and reaching the finals. She began to play Karina in Cuéntame cómo pasó in 2005, when she was 13 years old. She appeared in the TV series  (2011), Toledo, cruce de destinos (2012) and Servir y proteger (2017) and in the film Off Course (2015). After more than a decade in Cuéntame, Rivera left the series in 2018. She then finished her degree in child education and starred as Inés Suárez in the historical drama series Inés of My Soul (2020). She also featured as the lead in the Atresmedia limited series Alba and appeared in Heirs to the Land.

Filmography 
Television

Films

References

External links 

1992 births
Living people
Spanish film actresses
Spanish television actresses
21st-century Spanish actresses
People from Zaragoza
Spanish child actresses